Breanna Labadan (born 13 July 2006) is a Filipina rhythmic gymnast. She's the first gymnast from the Philippines to compete at the World Championships.

Personal life 
Her father Arnold Labadan led the Filipino rhythmic gymnastics delegation at the 2018 Vitrigo Cup International Competition in Kuala Lumpur, he has also served as chairman of the Gymnastics Association of the Philippines Athletes and Coaches Committee. Labadan took up gymnastics at age seven in Butuan after her parents enrolled her to a local club. In 2017 she began training with coach Dora Vass in Hungary, and has also spent time competing on the European rhythmic gymnastics circuit.

Career 
In 2019 Brenna was the Danish representative at the 1st Junior Rhythmic Gymnastics Championships in Moscow along Jessica Rayne Tijam, she was 39th with ball and 48th with clubs.

In 2022 she made her senior international debut at the World Championships in Sofia, being the first rhythmic gymnast from her country to attend the competition, where she finished 66th in the All-Around, 60th with hoop, 75th with ball, 76th with clubs and 59th with ribbon.

Achievements 

 First rhythmic gymnast representing the Philippines to compete at the World Championships when she participated in the 2022 edition of the tournament in Sofia, Bulgaria.

References 

2006 births
Living people
Filipino rhythmic gymnasts